Victoria Lucy Esson (born 6 March 1991) is a New Zealand association football goalkeeper, currently playing for Rangers and represents New Zealand at international level.

Early life
Esson started playing football at the age of 10 for Halswell United. Playing for Burnside High School, Esson became the team captain and played at Secondary School tournaments, getting selected to be part of South Island Secondary Schoolgirls squad and the Mainland's U-14 and U-16 squads.

Club career
Esson went to Texas Tech in 2011, becoming Tech's first-ever international football play in the schools history. Esson became Tech's all-time leader in career shut-outs, career goals against and set school records for single season and consecutive shut-outs. Esson also broke the Big 12 Conference record for single season shut-outs with 15 in 2013. Esson ended her time in goal at Tech, winning 41 of their 62 games, including six draws.

In 2014, Esson was captain of Mainland Pride as they won the National Women's League, the top-flight women's football tournament of New Zealand.

In February 2022, following the injury of first goalkeeper Jasmin Pal, Esson was signed by SC Sand.

In July 2022, Esson joined Scottish club Rangers.

International career
Esson was a member of the New Zealand U-17 side at the 2008 held in New Zealand, playing all three of three of New Zealand's group games. She was also part of the New Zealand U-20 teams for the 2008 and 2010 Women's World Cups but didn't make an appearance on the field.

Esson made her senior debut for the senior New Zealand team, the Football Ferns, against Thailand. Coming on as a sub in the 80th minute in their 5–0 win.

In April 2019, Esson was named to the final 23-player squad for the 2019 FIFA Women's World Cup.

Personal life
Esson completed her degree in wind, energy and industrial engineering while she was playing football at Texas Tech.

References

External links

Profile at NZF

1991 births
Living people
Footballers at the 2020 Summer Olympics
Olympic association footballers of New Zealand
New Zealand expatriate sportspeople in Germany
New Zealand expatriate sportspeople in the United States
New Zealand women's association footballers
New Zealand women's international footballers
Women's association football goalkeepers
2019 FIFA Women's World Cup players
Texas Tech Red Raiders women's soccer players
Rangers W.F.C. players
Expatriate women's footballers in Scotland
New Zealand expatriate women's association footballers
New Zealand expatriate sportspeople in Norway
New Zealand expatriate sportspeople in Scotland
Avaldsnes IL players
SC Sand players
Expatriate women's footballers in Norway
Expatriate women's footballers in Germany